The  Varanasi - Hubballi Weekly Express is an Express train belonging to South Western Railway zone that runs between Varanasi Junction and Hubballi Junction in India. It is currently being operated with 17324/17323 train numbers on a weekly basis.

Service

17324/Varanasi - Hubballi Weekly Express has an average speed of 51 km/hr and covers 2035 km in 39h 55m .

The 17323/Hubballi - Varanasi Weekly Express has an average speed of 48 km/hr and covers 2035 km in 42h 5m.

Route and halts 

The important halts of the train are:

Coach composite

The train has standard ICF Utkrisht Rakes with max speed of 110 kmph. The train consists of 21 coaches :

 1 AC II Tier
 2 AC III Tier
 6 Sleeper Coaches
 6 General
 2 Generators cum Luggage cum Parcel Car

Traction

Both trains are hauled by a Hubballi Loco Shed based WDP-4 diesel locomotive from Varanasi Junction to Hubballi Junction and vice versa.

Direction Reversal

Train Reverses its direction 1 times:

See also 

 Varanasi Junction railway station
 Hubli Junction railway station
 Mysore - Varanasi Express
 Vishwamanava Express

Notes

External links 

 17323/Hubballi - Varanasi Weekly Express
 17324/Varanasi - Hubballi Weekly Express

References 

Transport in Hubli-Dharwad
Express trains in India
Rail transport in Karnataka
Rail transport in Maharashtra
Rail transport in Madhya Pradesh
Passenger trains originating from Varanasi
Railway services introduced in 2017